Neoanalthes contortalis is a moth in the family Crambidae. It was described by George Hampson in 1900. It is found in the Russian Far East (Amur, Ussuri), China and Korea.

References

Moths described in 1900
Spilomelinae